The St. Nicholas Church is an Orthodox church in Moscopole, Albania. The church was erected in 1721.

It is a Cultural Monument of Albania since 1948.

History and description

The church was built in 1721. The structure consists of a basilica-type construction Struktura with a naos covered with a cupola, a narthex and a cloister. The interiors of the church are decorated with mural paintings executed by David Selenica and his helpers Kostandin and Kristo. The art of Selenicasi is distinguished by its realistic nature, as it is witnessed by the portrait of the donor, as well as by a deep theological knowledge. According to the inscription, the portrait of the donor the painting was finished in 1726 and this was determined by an archaeologic expedition in 1953. 24 years later, in 1750, the Zografi Brothers painted the cloister.

Liturgy
As of 2002, the time of the publication of a study on the Aromanians by German researcher Thede Kahl, priest Thomai was giving the Eastern Orthodox liturgy on the church in Aromanian, based on the text within the Aromanian Missal, and only thereafter in Albanian.

References

External links
Images from the church

Cultural Monuments of Albania
Churches in Korçë County
Eastern Orthodox church buildings in Albania
Churches in Moscopole
Churches completed in 1721